Serafim Mihaylov (born 25 April 1995) is a Bulgarian footballer, who currently plays as a forward for Hebar Pazardzhik in the Bulgarian V Group.

Career
Born in Plovdiv, Mihaylov began his career playing for Spartak Plovdiv. In 2011, his player's rights were purchased by Serbian football agent Mirko Miličević for €5,000.

In January 2012, Mihaylov began a trial with English side Manchester City. In July he traveled with the first squad for a pre-season training camp in Austria.

On 26 October 2012, Mihaylov joined Lokomotiv Plovdiv. Five days later, he made his debut in a 0–0 home draw against Litex Lovech in the Bulgarian Cup second round, as a second-half substitute for Atanas Kurdov.

References

External links
Profile at lportala.net

Living people
1995 births
Bulgarian footballers
Association football forwards
PFC Lokomotiv Plovdiv players
FC Hebar Pazardzhik players
PFC Pirin Gotse Delchev players
FC Spartak Plovdiv players
FC Oborishte players
First Professional Football League (Bulgaria) players